Love Legend of the Tang Dynasty, also known as Da Tang Qing Shi, is a Chinese historical television series based on the legend of an illicit romance between the Tang dynasty Princess Gaoyang and a monk called Bianji. The series was directed by Gong Ruofei, starring Tang Guoqiang, Shen Aojun, Nie Yuan, Zhang Tong, Pan Yueming, Pan Yaowu, and Qin Lan. It was first broadcast in mainland China in 2001.

Plot
This story is set during the Tang dynasty, during the reign of Emperor Taizong of Tang.

Princess Gaoyang is the daughter of Lady Dai and the Emperor. She is the Emperor's favorite daughter and was spoiled with several servants and attendants. Yet, she falls for a monk named Bianji, but their relationship is fated. He is a lowly monk whose life purpose is to abstain from romance, and she is a princess of high status. Despite her engagement to a rich noble named Fang Yi'ai, their affair persists in secret.

Meanwhile, Emperor Taizong deals with politics and the women in his harem. He is deeply in love with Lady Dai, the mother of Princess Gaoyang. He cares for Empress Zhangsun. He also favors Consort Yang and Consort Yin. The consorts all plot against each other to win his affections. One day, a young maiden named Meiniang enters his palace.

Cast

 Tang Guoqiang as Emperor Taizong of Tang
 Shen Aojun as Princess Gaoyang
 Xie Yue as young Princess Gaoyang
 Nie Yuan as Bianji
 Xu Boping as teenage Bianji
 Yin Yifan as child Bianji
 Zhao Qian as Empress Zhangsun
 Zhang Tong as Lady Dai
 Yan Danchen as Consort Yang
 Shen Rong as Consort Yin
 Yue Yueli as Fang Xuanling
 Zhuang Li as Fang Xuanling's wife
 Pan Yueming as Fang Yi'ai
 Ma Xiaowei as Fang Yizhi
 Xu Songyuan as Wei Zheng
 Feng Guoqiang as Zhangsun Wuji
 Xu Shaohua as Xuanzang
 He Xianda as Emperor Wen of Sui
 Wang Pin as Hou Junji
 Gao Liang as Li Daozong
 Zhang Shan as General Zong
 Han Zhenhua as Yan Liben
 Lu Yong as Gar Tongtsen Yülsung (Lu Dongzan)
 Zhang Shihui as Li Jiancheng
 Liu Haibo as Li Yuanji
 Zhong Cheng as Li Chengqian
 Chen Guanze as Li Chengqian (young)
 Pan Yaowu as Li Ke
 Li Tong as Li Ke (young)
 Yuan Shilong as Li Tai
 Liu E as Li You
 Huo Yaming as Li Zhi
 Ma Ke as Li Zhi (young)
 Qin Lan as Wu Meiniang
 Ye Xiaomin as Princess Wencheng
 Liu Jingcheng as Li Anyan
 Li Xin as Chengxin
 Zheng Ruhao as Li Chunfeng
 Li Shuming as Li Junyi
 Yin Xiaotian as Zhangsun Qian'er
 Wu Jing as Miss Bai
 Ding Kai as Shujie
 Gai Yi as Jingnu
 Zhao Erling as Fuyou
 Lu Ye as Old Man Fu

External links
  Love Legend of the Tang Dynasty on Sina.com

2001 Chinese television series debuts
Television series set in the Tang dynasty
Mandarin-language television shows
Chinese historical television series
Chinese romance television series